FEED is an American fashion company, founded by Lauren Bush-Lauren and Ellen Gustafson in 2007.

History 
FEED was co-founded by Lauren Bush-Lauren (granddaughter of George H.W. Bush and wife of David Lauren) and Ellen Gustafson in 2007. Lauren's idea was to create a tangible, shareable way to show consumers their impact, by stamping a number on every product that represents the school meals donated by their purchase. She was inspired by her travels as a student ambassador with the World Food Programme. Combining fashion and philanthropy she designed her first product, the FEED 1 Bag.

In 2012, FEED Projects is listed as a partner of the (RED) campaign, together with other brands such as Nike, Girl, American Express and Converse. The campaign's mission is to prevent the transmission of the HIV virus from mother to child by 2015 (the campaign's byline is "Fighting For An AIDS Free Generation").

In July 2019, FEED Projects signed a partnership with Ralph Lauren on a capsule collection. In May 2020, FEED Projects signed a partnership with Clarins to sell limited-edition bags filled with products from the cosmetics brand.

Description 
FEED is an impact-driven lifestyle brand, makes products that help feed children. FEED has provided more than 110 million meals to date globally through the World Food Programme and domestically through Feeding America and No Kid Hungry.

Every FEED product has a number on the packaging, indicating the number of school meals that will be provided to a child due to the purchase.

References

External links 
Official Website
7Treez Realtors
Organizations established in 2006
2010s fashion
Social enterprises
Bags (fashion)
Fashion accessory brands
Hunger relief organizations
2006 establishments in the United States